The Irish Women's Amateur Close Championship is the women's national amateur match play golf championship of Ireland. It was first played in 1894 and is currently organised by Golf Ireland.

The Irish Women's Amateur Close Championship is contested through two phases. It begins with a 36 hole stroke play competition, with the leading 32 competitors progressing to the knock-out match play competition.

It is a close event, entry being restricted to women born on the island of Ireland, or with one parent or grandparent born on the island of Ireland, or resident on the island of Ireland for five years. In addition, players must not have played for another country's international team or in another country's close championship, except at the under-18 or younger level.

Winners

Source:

References

External links
Golf Ireland

Amateur golf tournaments
Golf tournaments in Ireland
1894 establishments in Ireland
Recurring sporting events established in 1894